Guruvayur Kesavan is a 1977 Indian Malayalam-language film,  directed by Bharathan and produced by M. O. Joseph. The film stars Jayabharathi, Adoor Bhasi, M. G. Soman and Sukumari. It tells the story of Gajarajan Guruvayur Kesavan which belonged to the Guruvayur Temple.

Plot 
In a village, an elephant is brought into the Guruvayur temple as a deity. Soon, some villagers show extreme devotion while others indulge in exploitation.

Cast 

Jayabharathi as Nandini Kutty 
Adoor Bhasi as Achuthan Nair, Nandini Kutty's father 
M. G. Soman as Unni 
Sukumari as Thampuratti 
Manavalan Joseph as Shop Owner 
Sankaradi as Komunni Nair 
Baby Meena
Baby Vineetha
Bahadoor as Thaachunni 
Junior Sheela as Ammalu ,Maani Nair's wife 
M. S. Namboothiri
N. Govindankutty
Oduvil Unnikrishnan as Maani Nair 
Paravoor Bharathan as Shop Owner 
Thrissur Rajan
Ushakumari as Sreedevi Thampuratti 
Veeran
Puthur Unnikrishnan

Soundtrack 
The music was composed by G. Devarajan and the lyrics were written by P. Bhaskaran. The track "Navakaabhishekam" was set in raga Arabhi.

References

External links 
 

1970s Malayalam-language films
1977 films
Films about elephants
Films directed by Bharathan
Films set in Kerala
Films shot in Thrissur
Guruvayur